Edei (born Emma Deigman) is an English singer-songwriter.

Music career
Edei's career began when she was 10 years old, in the main role of Annie, and she performed "Hard Knock Life" alongside Jay-Z on Top of the Pops.
For the next few years she wrote to producers, seeking a solo career. She had the opportunity to perform in front of large crowds, and she began to receive offers to become a part of girl groups and audition for talent shows such as The X Factor. However, she was determined to become a successful solo artist on her own, with her own music.

When she toured the UK as a supporting artist to Girls Aloud in 2009, Edei was using her birth name, Emma Deigman.
Her debut single "In My Bed" was released through Alma Recordings on 12 July 2010, and the follow-up "Loved" was released on 16 January 2011 after much support from BBC Radio 2 (including a record of the week from Ken Bruce) and a nationwide tour with JLS.

Edei's debut album was written with Boston-born, Dublin-based producer Misreid and singer-songwriter Conner Reeves (whose writing credits include songs for Joss Stone, Ava Leigh and Tina Turner). Edei was not known as a celebrity in the US until 2015. She has been performing and acting in plays and playing small glitzy clubs, mostly for charity, and has donated her time and talent volunteering her services for charitable organizations. She is based in Los Angeles but divides her residences between L.A. and London.

Acting
Edei attended the Jackie Palmer Stage School and Hurtwood House School.

Edei appeared as an actress with her sister Laura in the 2001 film Last Orders, both playing the role of Sally, Edei playing the 10-year-old and Laura the 5-year-old Sally. Edei is also known for her acting credits, especially in the U.K.

Personal life
Edei's mother, Vicky, is a former casting agent who produced Wild Bill, and her father, Patrick, who is a property developer, comes from Helensburgh. She grew up in Great Missenden, and has three siblings, of whom the youngest, Laura Deigman, is a tennis player, who played in the 2011 Wimbledon Championships – Girls' Singles, and who won both the U-18 girls' singles and the ladies' singles titles in the Powder Byrne Tennis Trophy in 2010. Edei's uncle, Chris Turner, played tennis for Wales.

Edei attended a boarding school in Berkhamsted, but left when her father got cancer to help look after her younger brother and sister.

References 

Living people
English songwriters
People from Great Missenden
Year of birth missing (living people)